Josh Warrington (born 14 November 1990) is an English professional boxer. He is a two-time world featherweight champion, having held the IBF title between 2018 and 2022. At regional level, he held the British, Commonwealth, European and WBC International featherweight titles between 2013 and 2017. He made history in 2018 with his win over Lee Selby, making him the first male boxer from Leeds to win a major world title. As of October 2021, he is ranked as the world's fourth-best active featherweight by The Ring, fifth by the Transnational Boxing Rankings Board, and seventh by BoxRec.

In 2018, a documentary style movie filmed over two years called 'Fighting for a City' premiered. The film follows Warrington during his pursuit of winning the IBF title in his hometown at Elland Road Stadium, the home of Leeds United.

Professional career

Early career 
Warrington turned professional in 2009 and won on his professional debut against Wolverhampton's Delroy Spencer (11-89-3) in October before defeating Latvia's Pavels Senkovs (2-10-2), winning both four-round contests by 40-36 points decision.

In 2010, Warrington won all three of his fights, defeating Danny McDermid (0-1), John Riley (0-0) and Youssef Al Hamidi (7-27-2), winning all of his four-round contests by points decision.

By the end of 2011, Warrington maintained his undefeated record with wins over Steve Gethin (11-56-3), Chris Riley (3-3-2), Marc Callaghan (19-21-1), Dougie Curran (5-8-1) and Ian Bailey (7-8), all by points decision.

In the first half of 2012, Warrington defeated Dan Naylor (1-8) and Ibrar Riyaz (4-34-1) by points decision.

In November, Warrington won his first professional title after he defeated the previously unbeaten Dudley-born prospect Chris Male (11-0) by unanimous decision in a ten-round contest to win the vacant English featherweight title. The fight took place at the Venue in Dudley on 9 November.

Warrington vs. Speight 
On 22 March, Warrington made the first defence of his English featherweight title against former Southern Area super featherweight champion Jamie Speight (11-4). He won by unanimous decision over 10 rounds (scorecards of 100–91, 100–91, 100-90) when headlining a show at the Town Hall in Leeds.

Warrington vs. Bailey 
On 27 September, Warrington made the second defence of his English featherweight title after he defeated Southern Area featherweight champion Ian Bailey (9-14) by unanimous decision over 10 rounds. The scorecards read 100–91, 98–92, 100–90 in Warrington's favour. The fight took place at the Banqueting Suite at the Elland Road Stadium in Leeds.

Warrington vs. Mouneimne 
On 2 November, Warrington won the vacant Commonwealth featherweight title after he defeated the previously undefeated Hull-born prospect Samir Mouneimne by 12th-round stoppage in a 12-round contest. The fight took place at the Ice Arena in Hull and was Warrington's first fight on a Matchroom Boxing show.

2014

Warrington vs. Munroe 
In early April, it was announced that Warrington would make the first defence of his Commonwealth featherweight title against former super-bantamweight world title challenger Rendall Munroe (28-4-1) on 19 April. The fight would take place at the Manchester Arena on the undercard to Scott Quigg vs Tshifhiwa Munyai.

Warrington won by technical knockout in the seventh-round after Munroe's corner threw in the towel. Later that month, Munroe announced his retirement from boxing.

Warrington vs.Lindsay 
On 28 April, Matchroom Boxing announced that Warrington would make the second defence of his Commonwealth featherweight title and fight for the vacant British featherweight title against former British champion Martin Lindsay (21-2) at the First Direct Arena in Leeds on 21 May.

Warrington won by unanimous decision over twelve rounds with all three judges scoring the fight 119–110.

Five-fight Matchroom deal

On 27 August, Matchroom Boxing announced that Warrington had signed a five-fight deal with the promotional company. Speaking of the deal, Warrington said: "It’s great to have signed the deal so that I know that there’s going to be more big nights in Leeds in the next year."

Promoter Eddie Hearn said: "Josh is the biggest ticket seller in the country right now, and we have an opportunity to do something very big in Leeds. We dipped our toe in the water in May and now we’re diving in headfirst. It’s a huge opportunity for Josh and I think we could see one of the most memorable atmosphere in a British arena for some time."

Warrington vs. Dieli 
On 4 October, Warrington won the vacant EBU European featherweight title after he defeated Italy's Davide Dieli (15-3) by fourth-round stoppage in a twelve-round contest. The fight took place at the First Direct Arena in Leeds.

2015

Warrington vs. Tellez 
On 15 December, Matchroom Boxing announced that Warrington would fight on the undercard to Arthur Abraham vs Paul Smith in Berlin on 21 February, his first fight of the year.

Later it was confirmed that Warrington would fight Nicaragua's Edwin Tellez (9-11-5) in an eight-round contest.

Prior to the fight, Warrington told the Yorkshire Evening Post: "Even though he's not got an excellent record, he's a fighter that I cannot take lightly."

Warrington won by fifth-round stoppage

Warrington vs. Tubieron 
On 7 January, Matchroom Boxing announced that Warrington would fight Philippines' Dennis Tubieron (19-3-2) in a WBC world title eliminator and for the vacant WBC International featherweight title. The fight would headline a show at the First Direct Arena in Leeds on 11 April.

Warrington was accompanied by former Leeds United footballer Vinnie Jones during his ringwalk.

Warrington won by unanimous decision over twelve rounds, with all three judges scoring the fight 119–109.

After the fight, he admitted that he wasn't at his best, telling Sky Sports: "Looking back, I don’t think it was my best performance, but it’s all about learning. Maybe if I’d listened to my instructions a little bit more, I’d have got him out of there, but it’s all about experience. I can take so much from that fight."

Later that month, Warrington vacated his EBU European featherweight title after suffering a slight injury.

Warrington vs. Brunker 
On 22 June, Matchroom Boxing announced that Warrington would defend his WBC International and Commonwealth featherweight titles against Australia's Joel Brunker (28-1) at the First Direct Arena in Leeds on 5 September.

Warrington won by unanimous decision over twelve rounds, with all three judges scoring the fight 120–108.

2016

Warrington vs. Amagasa 
On 15 February, Matchroom Boxing announced that Warrington would make the second defence of his WBC International featherweight title against Japan's Hisashi Amagasa (30-5-2), a former world title challenger at super-bantamweight. The fight would headline the show at the First Direct Arena in Leeds on 16 April.

Promoter Eddie Hearn said of the fight: "Josh is hunting a summer clash with IBF champion Lee Selby, so he cannot afford any slip-ups against Japanese banger Amagasa."

Warrington won by unanimous decision over twelve rounds, with the scorecards reading 117–111, 118-111 and 120–107.

Warrington vs. Hyland 
On 14 June, Matchroom Boxing announced that Warrington would make the third defence of his WBC International featherweight title against Patrick Hyland (31-2), headlining a show at the First Direct Arena in Leeds on 30 July.

The WBC International featherweight title wasn't on the line for Hyland as he came in 2lbs and 6oz over weight at the weigh-in.

Warrington won by ninth-round technical knockout after he knocked Hyland down once in round eight and again round nine.

Leaving Matchroom and joining Frank Warren 
On 2 December 2016, Matchroom Boxing announced that Warrington's promotional contract with them had expired. Warrington's promoter and Matchroom managing director Eddie Hearn said in a statement "we did not share the same plans as his team and decided not to make any further offers."

After much speculation, Warrington officially signed for rival British promoter Frank Warren in a "long-term promotional deal" later in December. Warren said he was confident of delivering a first world title shot for Warrington as well as a number of shows in Leeds in 2017.

2017

Warrington vs. Martinez 
In February, Warren announced that Warrington would be making his return to the ring on 13 May at the First Direct Arena in Leeds. It was initially announced that Warrington would fight WBO Inter-Continental champion Marco McCullough. However, it was since announced that Warrington would not fight McCullough and would instead fight former IBF super-bantamweight world champion Kiko Martinez (36-7-1).

Warrington defeated Martinez by a majority decision over 12 rounds, with scorecards of 116-112 (twice) and 114–114, in the third defence of his WBC International title.

Warrington vs. Ceylan 
In August, it was announced that Warrington would fight the undefeated EBU European champion Dennis Ceylan (18-0-2) in an IBF world title final eliminator, to the title held by champion Lee Selby, at the First Direct Arena in Leeds on 21 October.

Commenting on the fight, Warrington said: "With Selby not taking a fight with me, it’s left me annoyed and even more hungry to produce a massive performance on October 21."

Warrington defeated Ceylan by tenth-round technical knockout after twice knocking down Ceylan in the same round.

Speaking of Lee Selby, Warrington told BT Sport in his post-fight interview that: "I want to get the Welshman up here. If we can make it at Elland Road, let's have it. I've waited so long and now I'm there."

2018

World title shot

Warrington vs. Selby 
On 23 January, it was confirmed that Warrington would fight IBF world champion Lee Selby (26-1) in his first world title fight on 19 May. On 30 January Elland Road Stadium was confirmed as the venue for the fight.

Warrington commented on the fight: "By winning this fight, not only do I get my hands on a world title, but it’s a chance to show everyone that I’m the best featherweight in the UK and propel myself onto the world level." Warrington was accompanied to the ring by ex Leeds United player Lucas Radebe whilst band Kaiser Chiefs performed live.
 
Warrington secured a split-decision victory over Selby by thoroughly outworking him for the majority of the twelve rounds to claim the title, and hand Selby his second career loss.

Warrington vs. Frampton 
A fight between Warrington and Carl Frampton had been scheduled for  22 December the same day as when Dillian Whyte fought Derek Chisora but that match was in the o2 The Warrington vs. Frampton match was in Manchester. In a fight that people thought was the fight of the year Warrington beat Frampton by Unanimous Decision after 12 rounds with two judges scoring the fight 116-112 and the third scoring it 116–113.

2019

Warrington vs. Takoucht 

On 7 August, it was confirmed that Warrington would defend the IBF featherweight championship for the third time against Sofiane Takoucht. The fight took place on 12 October, at the First Direct Arena in Leeds, England. This was the 13th time Warrington fought as a professional in his hometown of Leeds. In a one sided fight Warrington beat Takoucht by TKO in the second round.

Warrington vs. Galahad 
On 15 June 2019, Warrington had his second title defense against domestic rival and IBF #1 contender Kid Galahad in his hometown of Leeds. In a messy bout, with a lot of holding and clinching from both sides, Warrington proved to be the aggressor more often than his counterpart, which was sufficient to edge the victory and retail his world title. The scorecards read 116-113 and 116-112 in favor of Warrington, while the third judge scored the fight 115-113 for Galahad.

2021

Warrington vs. Lara 

Warrington faced Mauricio Lara, a relatively unknown 22-year-old Mexican prospect, on 13 February after over a year of inactivity. No title was on the line as Warrington had vacated his IBF featherweight title a month prior.  Warrington started off the fight slower than usual, and in the fourth round, he was hurt by a left hook before ultimately being knocked down. Despite getting up, Warrington never regained his legs, though he was able to land a few effective combinations on Lara in the subsequent rounds. In the ninth round, Lara once again knocked Warrington down with a left hook, and the fight was immediately called off by the referee, handing Warrington his first career loss. Lara's victory was considered a major upset, as he had been rated as an 11/1 (+1100) pre-fight underdog, compared to Warrington having been rated as the 1/33 (-3300) betting favourite. The Ring magazine opined that the result was an early candidate for its Upset of the Year award.

Warrington vs. Lara II 
It was announced on 14 July 2021 that Warrington and Lara would face each other in a rematch on 4 September at Emerald Headingley Stadium in the former's hometown of Leeds. The fight ended in a technical draw after 2 rounds, after Lara was badly cut above his left eye due to a head clash.

Team 
Warrington was signed to Eddie Hearn's Matchroom Boxing in the early stages of his career. He split from Matchroom to join Frank Warren's Queensberry Promotions in 2016, before rejoining Matchroom in February 2020. He is trained by his father, Sean O'Hagan. He is managed by Steve Wood, from VIP Boxing, who also manages former WBO lightweight world champion Terry Flanagan.

Personal life 
Warrington and his wife Natasha have twin daughters. He was excluded from John Smeaton Academy and didn't achieve the grades he needed to continue his education. He re-sat his exams on the advice of his father, Sean O'Hagan. He subsequently attended University of Leeds and gained a degree in 2013.

Professional boxing record

References

External links

Josh Warrington - Profile, News Archive & Current Rankings at Box.Live

 

|-

1990 births
English male boxers
Living people
Martial artists from Leeds
World featherweight boxing champions
Alumni of the University of Leeds
International Boxing Federation champions